Is There No Place On Earth For Me? is a nonfiction book written by Susan Sheehan and published in 1982 by Houghton Mifflin. It won the 1983 Pulitzer Prize for General Non-Fiction. This book recounts the lonely, harrowing life of Sylvia Frumkin who is diagnosed with schizophrenia.

Sheehan followed Frumkin for two-and-a-half years, much of which was spent inside a mental hospital, Creedmoor Psychiatric Center, in Queens. It presents outstanding reporting on  what it's like to be mentally ill and how the mental health system often fails in its treatment of those it was designed to help.

The book originally ran as a four-part series in The New Yorker in 1981 and won the 1983 Pulitzer Prize for non-fiction.

See also
 Rethinking Madness
 Elyn Saks
 Nellie Bly

References

External links

1982 non-fiction books
American biographies
Pulitzer Prize for General Non-Fiction-winning works
Houghton Mifflin books
Books about schizophrenia